The pilgrim's staff is a walking stick used by Christian pilgrims during their pilgrimages, like the Way of St. James to the shrine of Santiago de Compostela in Spain or the Via Francigena to Rome. In Rome, in the Middle Ages the pilgrims used to leave their stick in the church of San Giacomo Scossacavalli (not far from St. Peter), whose first denomination was San Salvatore de Bordonia, where Bordone is the Italian word for Stick. After that, they bought a new stick by sellers named Vergari (verga is another term for stick), whose shops were in today's Borgo Santo Spirito near the church of Santa Maria dei Vergari.

Background
Generally, the stick has a hook on it so that something may be hung from it. The walking stick sometimes has a cross piece on it. The pilgrim's staff has a strong association with the veneration of Saint James the Great and the pilgrimage to Santiago de Compostela.

The pilgrim's staff is also a heraldic device.

Gallery

See also
Cross of Saint James
Pilgrim badge
Jacob's staff
Pilgrim's hat
Khakkhara

References

Sources

External links

St James Major and the Pilgrim's staff
St. James with pilgrims

Christian pilgrimages
Christian symbols
Heraldic charges
Walking sticks